Ramy Sabry (also spelt Rami Sabry; born 15 March 1978) is an Egyptian singer and actor.

Career And Personal Life
After graduating from the music academy in Egypt, he had already started his musical career by composing songs for a few well-known singers. Three videos were shot, two of which were directed by Tarek Alarian and one by Moussa Eissa. Having album Launched First Single Ramy Sabry went on to participate in many musical events such as: live concerts, school proms and university welcome parties. Eventually, Ramy became successful and has now become a well known singer in Egypt.

Second album
In 2008, Ramy worked hard to put out his second album, but began experiencing delays. The  album was leaked to websites and all his work and efforts lost. Subsequently, the album has been postponed more than once. Ramy was racing against time to distribute and publish his album again, he was able to produce new songs for his album in record time. Finally, the album made it to market and has seen overwhelming success in sales despite minimal advertising, which was limited to one ad on television and some posters.

In 2015, Sabry released his music video for his single Agmal Layali Omri (اجمل ليالي عمري)(The Best Nights of My Life). In 2017 Ramy Sabry Released the album Al Ragel (The Man). In 2018 he signed with Rotana Records and released the single Ahd Al Donia. In 2019 He signed with Nogoum Records and released a new album Farek Maak (فارق معاك)

References

External links 

 Star Gate
 Fanoos
 

1978 births
Living people
21st-century Egyptian male singers
Egyptian male film actors
Egyptian male singers
Ramy Sabry
Egyptian male television actors
Singers from Cairo
Singers who perform in Egyptian Arabic
Rotana Records artists